A chuckwalla is a lizard of the species Sauromalus. Chuckwalla or chuckawalla may also refer to:

People
 Chuckawalla Bill, Spanish–American War and WW I veteran, prospector, cook, and vagabond

Locations
 Chuckwalla Mountains, in the Colorado Desert, California
 Chuckawalla Valley State Prison, near Blythe, California
 Little Chuckwalla Mountains, in the Colorado Desert, California
 the Chuckwalla River on the Central Coast of British Columbia, Canada